Elvis: That's the Way It Is is a 1970 American documentary film directed by Denis Sanders. The film documents American singer Elvis Presley's Summer Festival in Las Vegas during August 1970. It was his first non-dramatic film since the beginning of his film career in 1956, and the film gives a clear view of Presley's return to live performances after years of making films. The film was released simultaneously with Presley's similarly titled twelfth studio album, That's the Way It Is.

Overview 
The original concept – as devised by technical advisor Colonel Tom Parker – was a closed circuit television presentation of one show, in view of Presley's triumphant return to live performances. The film was ultimately shot with eight Panavision cameras, in 35mm anamorphic format.

Although most of the footage takes place onstage at the International Hotel in Las Vegas, there are several other parts to the film:

The opening credits sequence contains footage of  Presley's show at Arizona Veterans Memorial Coliseum in Phoenix on September 9, 1970. This was the first show of Presley's first tour in 13 years.
 Presley and his band are seen rehearsing for the Las Vegas engagement at MGM Studios in Culver City, California.  There are scenes of  Presley running through such tunes as "I Just Can't Help Believing", "What'd I Say", "Little Sister", "Words", "That's All Right Mama", and "The Next Step Is Love."  Presley and his group are also heard performing a tongue-in-cheek rendition of "Crying Time". The rehearsal sequences were filmed during late July 1970.
Later rehearsals show  Presley in Las Vegas with his back-up vocalists The Sweet Inspirations, Millie Kirkham and The Imperials, preparing songs such as "You Don't Have to Say You Love Me" and "Bridge Over Troubled Water".
There is also a session of rehearsals that takes place in the Showroom Internationale of the International Hotel (now known as the Westgate Hotel and Casino) in Las Vegas. Together,  Presley and the entire group run through songs from "Mary In the Morning" to "Polk Salad Annie". These rehearsals took place on August 7, 1970.
Footage of an Elvis Appreciation Society convention in Luxembourg was shot on September 5, 1970. Radio Luxembourg DJs Tony Prince and Peter Aldersley are on hand to lead the festivities. A tandem bicycle owned by  Presley is raffled off to a lucky fan in the audience. Additionally, various musicians are seen performing their own versions of  Presley's songs.

Onstage in Las Vegas

The Elvis Summer Festival at the International Hotel began on August 10, 1970, and the MGM film crew was on hand to film this show as well as the evening and midnight performances of August 11, 12 and 13. He sings many well-known songs, including several of those that he had been seen rehearsing earlier in the film. The songs are:

"Mystery Train"/"Tiger Man"
"That's All Right Mama"
"I've Lost You"
"Love Me Tender"
"In the Ghetto"
"Patch It Up"
"You've Lost That Lovin' Feelin'"
"I Just Can't Help Believin'"
"Sweet Caroline"
"Heartbreak Hotel"
"One Night"
"Blue Suede Shoes"
"All Shook Up"
"Polk Salad Annie
"Bridge Over Troubled Water"
"Suspicious Minds"
"Can't Help Falling in Love"
"Don't Be Cruel"
"You Don't Have to Say You Love Me"

Presley is also seen relaxing in his hotel suite with various members of his entourage. The movie is also intercut with footage of fans offering commentary about what Presley means to them; officials at the International Hotel; and celebrities (including Sammy Davis Jr., Cary Grant, Charo, George Hamilton, Juliet Prowse and Xavier Cugat) arriving for opening night of the show.

Shows/rehearsals

 July 14 rehearsal (M.G.M. Stage 1, Culver City, California)
 July 15 rehearsal (M.G.M. Stage 1, Culver City, California)
 July 24 rehearsal (R.C.A. studios, Hollywood, California)
 July 29 rehearsal (M.G.M. studios, Culver City, California)
 August 4 rehearsal (Convention Center, International Hotel, Las Vegas, Nevada)
 August 7 stage rehearsal
 August 10 stage rehearsal
 August 10 opening night show
 August 11 dinner show
 August 11 midnight show
 August 12 dinner show
 August 12 midnight show
 August 13 dinner show
 September 9 (Arizona Veterans Memorial Coliseum, Phoenix)

Cast
Elvis Presley
The Imperials (vocals)
Terry Blackwood
Armond Morales
Joe Moscheo
Jim Murray
Roger Wiles
The Sweet Inspirations (vocals)
Estell Brown
Myrna Smith
Sylvia Shemmell
Ann Williams
TCB Band
Joe Guercio (orchestra conductor)
James Burton (lead guitar)
John Wilkinson (rhythm guitar)
Charlie Hodge (acoustic guitar and harmony vocals)
Glen D. Hardin (pianos)
Jerry Scheff (bass)
Ron Tutt (drums)
Richard Davis 
Sammy Davis, Jr
Joe Esposito
Felton Jarvis
Millie Kirkham (vocals)
Del 'Sonny' West
Red West

Reception
The film opened in the week ending November 11, 1970 at the Uptown I theater in Toronto, Canada grossing a mild $9,500 for the week. It expanded to at least 9 cities the following week (including San Francisco, Portland, Denver and San Antonio) grossing $78,950 from the sample cities covered by Variety and placing 25th on their box office chart. Based on the sample cities covered by Variety, it grossed $332,714 from 110 play weeks in 1970. In Japan it grossed $700,000 in its first 6 weeks.

Gene Siskel of the Chicago Tribune described it as "a carefully managed […] concert designed to promote his future engagements in Nevada." He noted that "fans will be enthralled as Presley sings more than a dozen of his hits" but that "persons hoping to learn about the man after hours will be disappointed."

2001 version
In 2001, a new version of That's the Way it Is was compiled. The new version eliminated much of the documentary and non-Elvis content of the original in favor of adding additional performances of Elvis rehearsing and in concert. The final film runs 12 minutes shorter than the original, but contains more music, although several performances included in the original film are omitted (most notably the concert performance of "I Just Can't Help Believin'", even though the new version of the film features footage of Presley rehearsing the song and being concerned about remembering its lyrics on stage).

The special edition was released on January 19, 2001, when this new version made its worldwide debut on the cable network, Turner Classic Movies and produced by award-winning producer Rick Schmidlin.

In August 2007 a two-disc DVD "special edition" was released by Warner/Turner that has both the reworked version plus the original cut. The original, however, has only a mono soundtrack (it was made with four-track stereo). The DVD also includes approximately 35 minutes of additional performances and other footage that was not included in either edition.

2014 version
A two-disc Special Edition Premium Digibook was announced for release on August 12, 2014. 
With thousands of feet of materials including sequences added to capture with greater intimacy Elvis' performances and his creative process behind-the-scenes, the previously released Special Edition is now being made available as a Blu-ray two-disc.

See also
 List of American films of 1970
Elvis Presley on film and television
Elvis Presley discography

References

External links
For Elvis Fans Only Website dedicated to Elvis Presley's Movies.

 Elvis performing I Just Can't Help Believin' from Elvis: That's the Way It Is 
 Elvis performing Bridge Over Troubled Water from Elvis: That's the Way It Is

DVD reviews
Review by Ian Jane at DVD Talk, August 27, 2007.

1970 films
1970 documentary films
1970s musical films
American documentary films
Documentary films about singers
1970s English-language films
Films directed by Denis Sanders
Metro-Goldwyn-Mayer films
Films shot in the Las Vegas Valley
Films shot in Nevada
Films shot in California
Films shot in Arizona
Westgate Las Vegas
Concert films
Films about Elvis Presley
Rockumentaries
1970s American films